Revolutionary Sites are designated historical sites in North Korea. The sites were designated by Kim Jong-il when he began working at the Propaganda and Agitation Department of the Workers' Party of Korea in 1966. He would send troops all over the country to unearth sites that "were supposedly once forgotten and undiscovered". By converting North Korea into a "huge open museum", Kim's goal in designating the sites was to solidify the North Korean cult of personality centered around him and his father Kim Il-sung.

In 1988, there were 27 such sites. Today, there are more than 60. Of them, 40 commemorate Kim Il-sung, 20 Kim Jong-il, and many others Kim Hyong-jik, Kim Jong-suk, Kim Hyong-gwon and other members of the Kim family.

There are two categories of sites, Revolutionary Sites and Revolutionary Battle Sites. Rather than a single building or a point of interest, the sites spawn large areas. Some famous Revolutionary Sites include Mangyongdae, the birthplace of Kim Il-sung, in Pyongyang, and Jangjasan Revolutionary Site and Oun Revolutionary Site associated with the youth of Kim Jong-il. The Mount Paektu area in particular hosts many sites.

South Koreans have criticized the sites for "wip[ing] out traditional culture".

List

Revolutionary Sites

 Chaho Revolutionary Site
 Changgol Revolutionary Site
 Changsan Revolutionary Site
 Chilgol Revolutionary Site
 Chongam Revolutionary Site
 Chongsu Revolutionary Site
 Chosan Revolutionary Site
 Haktanggol Revolutionary Site
 Hoeryong Revolutionary Site
 Hyangha Revolutionary Site
 Jangjasan Revolutionary Site
 Jangsusan Revolutionary Site
 Jihyesan Revolutionary Site
 Jonsung Revolutionary Site
 Junggang Revolutionary Site
 Kaechon Revolutionary Site
 Kaeson Revolutionary Site
 Kangso County Party Revolutionary Site
 Kochigang Revolutionary Site
 Kosanjin Revolutionary Site
 Kumchon Revolutionary Site
 Kumsugol Revolutionary Site
 Kunja Revolutionary Site
 Kwangjong Revolutionary Site
 Kwanhakgol Revolutionary Site 
 Malum Revolutionary Site
 Mangyongdae Revolutionary Site
 Mirim Revolutionary Site
 Munsubong Revolutionary Site
 Naedong Revolutionary Site
 Naesong Revolutionary Site
 Okchon Revolutionary Site
 Oun Revolutionary Site
 Paeksong Revolutionary Site
 Phophyong Revolutionary Site
 Phothae Revolutionary Site
 Phyongchon Revolutionary Site
 Ponghwa Revolutionary Site
 Pothonggang Revolutionary Site
 Pultanggol Revolutionary Site
 Rimyongsu Revolutionary Site
 Ryongaksan Revolutionary Site
 Ryonghyon Revolutionary Site
 Ryongpho Revolutionary Site
 Ryudong Revolutionary Site
 Samdung Revolutionary Site
 Sansong Revolutionary Site
 Sinpha Revolutionary Site
 Sniff Revolutionary Site
 Soksagol Revolutionary Site
 Sonbong Revolutionary Site
 Songhung Revolutionary Site
 Songjon Revolutionary Site
 Ssangunri Revolutionary Site
 Ssuksom Revolutionary Site
 Sungap Revolutionary Site
 Tokgol Revolutionary Site
 Tonghungsan Revolutionary Site
 Wangjaesan Revolutionary Site
 Wonhwa Revolutionary Site
 Wonsan Station Revolutionary Site
 Yombun Revolutionary Site
 Yombunjin Revolutionary Site
 Yuphyong Revolutionary Site

Revolutionary Battle Sites

 Angup Revolutionary Battle Site
 Insan Revolutionary Battle Site
 Kusi Barrage Revolutionary Battle Site
 Paektusan Revolutionary Battle Sites
 Pochonbo Revolutionary Battle Site
 Pujon Revolutionary Battle Site
 Rangrim Revolutionary Battle Site
 Samjiyon Revolutionary Battle Site
 Sinhung Area Revolutionary Battle Site
 Sinsadong Revolutionary Battle Site
 Taehongdan Revolutionary Battle Site

See also

 History of North Korea
 Korean independence movement
 List of museums in North Korea
 List of tourist attractions in Pyongyang

References

Works cited

External links
Revolutionary Sites  at korea-dpr.com

Historic sites in North Korea